Perelandra can refer to:

 Perelandra, the second novel in C. S. Lewis's Space Trilogy. The name refers to the planet Venus
 Perelandra, an opera by Donald Swann and David Marsh, based on the novel
 "Perelandra", the title of a song by Circle of Dust
 Perelandra (album), a 1995 album by Glass Hammer
 Perelandra, an album by Kevin Braheny (Hearts of Space Records, HS001T)